Karol Wolfram (5 November 1899, in Warsaw – 21 September 1965, in Warsaw) was a Polish Evangelical priest and professor and pro-rector of the Christian Theological Academy in Warsaw.

He entered the Gymnasium (Władysława IV) in Warsaw, in 1920 he began Evangelical theology study on the University of Warsaw. 1924 he was ordained after his studies. He work as vicar in Warsaw for a time. Later he was a provost in Nowy Dwór Mazowiecki, where he was an auxiliary chaplain to the Polish Army from 1926 to 1929. He completed his studies in Germany. After his return from Germany, he became assistant of the University of Warsaw, where he worked on the New Testament.

In 1935 he became postgraduate university lecturer.

During World War II he taught at the clandestine Methodist Bible School in Poland.

He was buried in the Evangelical cemetery in Warsaw.

References

1899 births
Polish evangelicals
1965 deaths
Clergy from Warsaw